Chekiyot Kizhakkeveettill Vineeth (born 20 May 1988), commonly known as C. K. Vineeth, is an Indian professional footballer who plays as a forward for RoundGlass Punjab in the I-League.

Personal life
Born in Kannur district in the state of Kerala, he studied in JNV Kasaragod and the S. N. College, Kannur.

Career

Chirag United Kerala
Vineeth made his debut for Chirag United Kerala in the I-League during the 2010–11 season after starting his amateur career with Chennai Customs and Kerala State Electricity. He scored his first professional goal of his career during his debut. During the 2011–12 season, Vineeth scored eight goals for Chirag Kerala.

United Sports Club
Before the 2012–13 season, Vineeth signed for United SC (then Prayag United) of the I-League. Vineeth made his debut for the club on 7 October 2012 against Air India. He played 82 minutes and scored a goal as United SC won, 5–1. Vineeth scored a hat-trick later that season against Air India on 2 February 2013 as United SC won 4–1. Vineeth went on to score seven goals that season, the most among all Indian players.

Bengaluru FC
On 30 January 2014, it was announced that Vineeth had been released by United SC due to financial difficulties and then signed for Bengaluru FC, the new direct-entry I-League side, for the remainder of the season. In his debut season with the club, he won the I-League, as the club was declared winner after defeating Dempo.

Bengaluru would extend his contract after an impressive half season. He signed a two-year contract with Bengaluru at the end of the season 2014–15 season, which would keep him at the club until the end of the 2016–17 I-League season. He was with the team when the team won their maiden Federation Cup title.

In 2015-16 I-League season, he scored 4 times in the league, thus helping his team win the league title for the second time in 3 years.

His brace against Mohun Bagan in the finals of 2016-17 Federation Cup final won his team their second title in 4 years.

Kerala Blasters

In July 2015 Vineeth was drafted to play for Kerala Blasters FC in the 2015 Indian Super League. However, he had a poor season as he was hardly chosen, and Kerala Blasters ended up last in the table.
In 2016, Vineeth could only start playing for the Blasters in the eighth game as he was playing the AFC Cup with Bengaluru FC. He 
had his first appearance as an 85th-minute substitute against FC Goa, where he scored a 95th-minute winner to help the team record a 2–1 win against FC Goa. In his next match, he scored 2 goals in the 85th and 87th minute respectively to help Blasters win against Chennaiyin FC 3–1.
Vineeth scored several crucial goals to guide his team to the finals, where they were defeated by Atletico de Kolkata on penalties. He ended the campaign as the top Indian goalscorer with 5 goals from 9 matches.

2017–2018 
On 5 July 2017 it was announced that Vineeth had been retained by the Kerala Blasters for the 2017–18 ISL season. He made his first appearance for the club during the first match of the season against ATK on 17 November 2017. Vineeth started and played 80 minutes as the match ended 0–0. On 3 December 2017, in the team's third match of the season against Mumbai City, Vineeth was sent off after being issued two yellow cards within nine minutes. On his return from suspension, Vineeth scored the only goal in a 1–0 victory for the Kerala Blasters over NorthEast United.

Chennaiyin FC (loan)

Vineeth later moved to Chennaiyin FC on loan from Kerala Blasters and also participated in the AFC Cup 2019.
Vineeth made 13 appearances for Chennayin, including 7 in the AFC Cup 2019. He also played in the Hero Super Cup 2019 final against FC Goa, which he lost 2–1.

East Bengal

In May 2020, Vineeth shifted his base from Jamshedpur to East Bengal.

International
Vineeth made his international debut for India on 6 February 2013 against Palestine in an international friendly, coming on as an 85th-minute substitute for Clifford Miranda as India lost 4–2.

Career statistics

Club

International stats

Statistics accurate as of match played 17 February 2014

Honours

Club
 Bengaluru FC
 I-League: Winner (2) : 2013–14, 2015—16
 Federation Cup: Winner (2) : 2014–15 2016-17
 Kerala Blasters FC
 Indian Super League: Runner-up (1) : 2016
 Chennaiyin FC
 Super Cup: Runner-up (1) : 2019

References

External links
 Indian Super League Profile

1988 births
Living people
Sportspeople from Kannur
Indian footballers
Chirag United Club Kerala players
United SC players
Bengaluru FC players
Kerala Blasters FC players
Association football midfielders
Footballers from Kerala
I-League players
India international footballers
Kerala Blasters FC draft picks
Indian Super League players
East Bengal Club players
Jamshedpur FC players